In the mathematical discipline of set theory, a cardinal characteristic of the continuum is an infinite cardinal number that may consistently lie strictly between  (the cardinality of the set of natural numbers), and the cardinality of the continuum, that is, the cardinality of the set  of all real numbers. A variety of such cardinal characteristics arise naturally, and much work has been done in determining what relations between them are provable, and constructing models of set theory for various consistent configurations of them.

Background 

Indeed the assumption that  is the well-known Continuum Hypothesis, which was shown to be independent of the standard ZFC axioms for set theory by Paul Cohen.

Examples 

As is standard in set theory, we denote by  the least infinite ordinal, which has cardinality ; it may be identified with the set of all natural numbers.

A number of cardinal characteristics naturally arise as cardinal invariants for ideals which are closely connected with the structure of the reals, such as the ideal of Lebesgue null sets and the ideal of meagre sets.

non(N) 

The cardinal characteristic non() is the least cardinality of a non-measurable set; equivalently, it is the least cardinality of a set that is not a Lebesgue null set.

Bounding number  and dominating number 

For any two functions  and  we denote by  the statement that for all but finitely many . The bounding number  is the least cardinality of an unbounded set in this relation, that is, 

Clearly any such dominating set  is unbounded, so  is at most , and a diagonalisation argument shows that .

Splitting number  and reaping number  

The splitting number  is the least cardinality of a subset  of  such that for all , there is some  such that  splits . That is, 

That is,

Ultrafilter number 

Kunen gave a model of set theory
in which  but , and using a countable support iteration of Sacks forcings, Baumgartner and Laver

Almost disjointness number 

(that is, their intersection is infinite).  The almost disjointness number  is the least cardinality of an infinite maximal almost disjoint family.
A basic result<ref>Eric van Douwen. The Integers and Topology. In K. Kunen and J.E. Vaughan (eds) Handbook of Set-Theoretic Topology.  North-Holland, Amsterdam, 1984.</ref> is that
; Shelah showed that it is consistent to have the strict inequality .

 Cichoń's diagram 

A well known diagram of cardinal characteristics is Cichoń's diagram, showing all pair-wise relations provable in ZFC between 10 cardinal characteristics.

 References 

 Further reading 
 Tomek Bartoszyński and Haim Judah.  Set Theory On the Structure of the Real Line''.  A K Peters, 1995.

 
 

Cardinal numbers